Yersinia ruckeri is a species of Gram-negative bacteria, known for causing enteric redmouth disease in some species of fish. Strain 2396-61 (= ATCC 29473) is its type strain.

A draft genome for Yersinia ruckeri has been published.

References

Further reading

External links
LSPN lpsn.dsmz.de

Type strain of Yersinia ruckeri at BacDive -  the Bacterial Diversity Metadatabase

ruckeri
Bacteria described in 1978